Durendal, also spelled Durandal, is the sword of Roland, a legendary paladin and partially historical officer of Charlemagne in French epic literature. It is also said to have belonged to young Charlemagne at one point, and, passing through Saracen hands, came to be owned by Roland. 

The sword has been given various provenances. Several of the works of the Matter of France agree that it was forged by Wayland the Smith, who is commonly cited as a maker of weapons in chivalric romances.

Etymology
The name Durendal arguably begins with a French dur- stem, meaning "hard". Thus Rita Lejeune argued it may break down into durant + dail, renderable in English as "strong scythe" or explained in more detail to mean "a scimitar or scythe which holds, up, resists, endures". Gerhard Rohlfs suggested dur + end'art or "strong flame". The name may also connote the meaning of "enduring".

The Pseudo-Turpin explains that the name "Durenda is interpreted to mean it gives a hard strike" (Durenda interpretatur durum ictum cum ea dans). It has been argued also that the fact that Pseudo-Turpin needed to gloss the name is evidence it was not a name readily understood in French, hence a foreign name.

One non-French etymology is Edwin B. Place's attempt to construe it in Breton as diren dall, meaning "blade [that] dulls cutting edge" or "blade blinds". Another is James A. Bellamy's Arabic etymology, explaining a possible meaning of the sword's name to be "Ḏū l-jandal" meaning "master of stone".

Chanson de Roland
 
According to La Chanson de Roland (The Song of Roland), the sword was brought by an angel to Charlemagne who was at the vale of Moriane, and Charlemagne then gave it to Roland. In that poem, the sword is said to contain within its golden hilt a tooth of Saint Peter, blood of Basil of Caesarea, hair of Saint Denis, and a piece of the raiment of Mary, mother of Jesus, 

At the Battle of Roncevaux Pass, Roland took the rearguard to hold off the Saracen army troops long enough for Charlemagne's army to retreat into France. Roland slew a vast number of enemies wielding Durendal. With the sword Roland even succeeded in slicing the right arm of the Saracen king Marsile, and decapitated the king's son, Jursaleu, sending the one-hundred-thousand-strong army to flight.

Roland later attempted to destroy the sword by hitting it against blocks of marble, to prevent it from being captured by the attacking Saracens. But Durendal proved indestructible. After being mortally wounded, Roland hid it beneath his body as he lay dying along with the oliphant, the horn used to alert Charlemagne before succumbing to his injury.

Properties
According to legend, the sword was capable of cutting through giant boulders of stone with a single strike, and was indestructible.

Previous ownership
Durendal was once captured (but not kept) by the young Charlemagne, according to the 12th-century fragmentary chanson de geste Mainet (the title of which refers to the pseudonym Charles adopted in his youth), when he fled to Spain. Young Charles (Mainés in the text) slays Braimant, obtaining his sword (Durendaus). This content is better preserved in some non-chanson de geste texts, and in other language adaptations such as the Franco-Italian Karleto. The place of combat was near the vale of Moriane (Vael Moriale), near Toledo, according to the Low-German version Karl Mainet.

Many years later, the owner of Durendal prior to Roland was a Saracen named Aumon, son of king Agolant, according to another 12th-century chanson de geste Aspremont. Young Roland, mounted on Naimes's horse Morel without permission, and armed only with a rod, defeated Aumon, conquering the sword as well as the horse Veillantif.

These materials were combined in the Italian prose Aspramonte by Andrea da Barberino in the late 14th to early 15th century. That work stated that after young Carlo (Charlemagne) came in possession of Durindarda (Durendal) by killing Bramante in Spain, Galafro gave it to Galiziella, who then gave it to Almonte the son of Agolante (i.e.). Galiziella is glossed as the bastard daughter of Agolante, making her Almonte's half-sister. Durindana is eventually won by Orlandino (young Orlando).

Andrea da Barberino was a major source for later Italian writers. Boiardo's Orlando innamorato traces the sword's origin to Hector of Troy; it belonged for a while to Amazonian queen Pantasilea, and was passed down to Almonte, before Orlando gained possession of it. Ludovico Ariosto's Orlando Furioso follows Boiardo, saying it once belonged to Hector of Troy, but that it was given to Roland by Malagigi (Maugris).

Local lore

Tradition has it that when Roland cut a huge gash in the rocks with one blow, it created Roland's Breach in the Pyrenees in the process.

Legend in Rocamadour, in the Lot department, claims that the true Durendal was deposited in the chapel of Mary there, but was stolen by Henry the Young King in 1183.

Local folklore also claims Durendal still exists, embedded in a cliff wall in Rocamadour. In that version, twelfth-century monks of Rocamadour claim Roland threw the sword rather than hiding it beneath himself, creating a crevice "due to its sharpness" in the wall. However, the local tourist office now calls the sword a replica of Durendal.

In popular culture

In the 1992 Super Sentai series Kyōryū Sentai Zyuranger, the monster Dora Knight, an evil black knight under the service of Bandora, wielded a magic sword called Durandal. 

In the Fire Emblem videogame series, Durandal is the name of the legendary claymore once wielded by one of the Eight Legends of Elibe, Roland, and later passed to his descendant and one of the main characters of Fire Emblem: The Blazing Blade, Eliwood of Pherae.

Honkai Impact 3rd has a character named Durandal, who, in the story, is considered the strongest S-Rank Valkyrie of the fictional organization Schicksal.

In the game Marathon (video game), first released in 1994 for the Macintosh by Bungie, Durandal is the name of a psychotic AI prominently featured throughout the game's story. Bungie would later set a trend of naming their fictional AI after famous swords with Cortana (Curtana) in the Halo (franchise) series.

In the Xianxia-inspired series of novels "The Godking's Legacy" by author Virlyce Durandal is the name of one of the main characters, a sentient sword that previously belonged to the legendary warrior-mage Roland.

In The Dresden Files book series, Durendal is one of three powerful swords each linked to a positive emotion.  In particular, Durendal is linked to hope.

In the game Terraria, Durendal is a weapon that the player is able to craft using Hallowed Bars.  However, instead of being a sword, it instead functions as a whip.

In the 2020 Kamen Rider series Kamen Rider Saber, one member of the Sword of Logos, Ryoga Shindai, is called Kamen Rider Durendal, named after the blade of the same name.

In the 2022 game Chained Echoes Glenn's ultimate was the sword Durandal, crafted by using a Soul of Farnese on the Rusty Sword key item.

In the 2020 Game Library Of Ruina, Durendal is the signature weapon of Roland, one of the main protagonists and previous color fixer. He uses Durendal alongside an arsenal of workshop weapons that his wife Angelica owned.

Explanatory notes

References

Citations

General bibliography

Primary sources 

  
 ; volume 2 (1921).

Secondary sources 

 
 
  

Medieval European swords
Mythological swords
The Song of Roland